The 1983 Schweppes County Championship was the 84th officially organised running of the County Championship. Essex won the Championship title. The Championship was sponsored by Schweppes for the sixth and final time.

In May 1983, in the match between Essex and Surrey at Chelmsford, Surrey were dismissed in their first innings for 14 runs.

Table
16 points for a win
8 points to each side for a tie
8 points to side still batting in a match in which scores finish level
Bonus points awarded in the first 100 overs of the first innings
Batting: 150 runs - 1 point, 200 runs - 2 points 250 runs - 3 points, 300 runs - 4 points
Bowling: 3-4 wickets - 1 point, 5-6 wickets - 2 points 7-8 wickets - 3 points, 9-10 wickets - 4 points
No bonus points awarded in a match starting with less than 8 hours' play remaining. A one-innings match is played, with the winner gaining 12 points.
Position determined by points gained. If equal, then decided on most wins.
Each team plays 24 matches.

References

1983 in English cricket
County Championship seasons